John Erik Ezelius (born 1986) is a Swedish politician, army officer and member of the Riksdag, the national legislature. A member of the Social Democratic Party, he has represented Västra Götaland County East since September 2018. He had previously been a substitute member of the Riksdag for Urban Ahlin twice: September 2014 to October 2015; and January 2016 to September 2018.

Ezelius is the son of project manager Peter Ezelius and nurse Lena Ezelius (née Karlsson). He was educated in Tidaholm and worked as substitute teacher and appliance salesman. He has a military officer degree from the Swedish Defence University and has been a platoon leader in the Skaraborg Regiment since 2012. He has been a member of the municipal council in Tidaholm Municipality since 2006.

References

1986 births
Living people
Members of the Riksdag 2018–2022
Members of the Riksdag 2022–2026
Members of the Riksdag from the Social Democrats
People from Tidaholm Municipality
Swedish Army officers